Victor Lupo Puiu (born February 1, 1979) is a Romanian professional boxer living and fighting out of Toronto, Canada.

Professional career 
Victor Lupo won a ten-round majority decision against the former WBC Super Lightweight Champion Junior Witter (37-4-2, 22 KOs) in a welterweight bout on February 19, 2011, at the Hershey Centre, Mississauga, Ontario, Canada. Scores were 97-92, 96-94, 95-95. Witter was docked a point for holding in round nine and spent a lot of time on the canvas totally gassed. With the win, Lupo claimed the vacant WBC Silver International title.

On December 17, 2011, he lost a hard fought decision against the welterweight Antonin Décarie (26-1 7KO) who captured the WBC International belt. In a bout that had as many clenches as punches, Decarie was able to prevail with 117-112, 118-110, 118-110 decision. The fight took place Quebec City at the Pepsi Colisée.

Professional record 

|-
|align="center" colspan=8|20 Wins (9 knockouts, 11 decisions), 2 Losses, 2 Draws 
|-
|align=center style="border-style: none none solid solid; background: #e3e3e3"|Res.
|align=center style="border-style: none none solid solid; background: #e3e3e3"|Record
|align=center style="border-style: none none solid solid; background: #e3e3e3"|Opponent
|align=center style="border-style: none none solid solid; background: #e3e3e3"|Type
|align=center style="border-style: none none solid solid; background: #e3e3e3"|Rd., Time
|align=center style="border-style: none none solid solid; background: #e3e3e3"|Date
|align=center style="border-style: none none solid solid; background: #e3e3e3"|Location
|align=center style="border-style: none none solid solid; background: #e3e3e3"|Notes
|-align=center
|Won
|20-2-2
|align=left| Jose Manuel Lopez Clavero
| UD || 6 
|2015-02-21 || align=left| Sala Polivalentă, Cluj-Napoca, Romania
|align=left|
|-align=center
|Loss
|19-2-2
|align=left| Antonin Décarie
| UD || 12 
|2011-12-17 || align=left| Pepsi Coliseum, Quebec City, Canada
|align=left|
|-align=center
|Win
|19-1-2
| align=left| Junior Witter
| UD || 10 
|2011-02-19	
|align=left| Hershey Centre, Mississauga, Canada
|align=left|
|-align=center
|Win
|18-1-2
|align=left| Antonio Soriano
| UD || 8 
|2010-04-03 || align=left| Montreal Casino, Montreal, Canada
|align=left|
|-align=center
|style="background:#abcdef;"|Draw
|17-1-2
|align=left| Ulises Jimenez
| PTS || 8 
|2010-01-16 || align=left| Hershey Centre, Mississauga, Canada
|align=left|
|-align=center
|Win
|17-1-1
|align=left| Leonardo Rojas
| TKO || 9 
|2008-02-29 || align=left| Bell Centre, Montreal, Canada
|align=left|
|-align=center
|Loss
|16-1-1
|align=left| Paul Clavette
| MD || 8 
|2007-11-30 || align=left| Centre Marcel Dionne, Drummondville, Canada
|align=left|
|-align=center
|Win
|16-0-1
|align=left| Amilcar Edgardo Funes Melian
| UD || 8 
|2006-10-28 || align=left| Casino du Lac-Leamy, Hull, Canada
|align=left|
|-align=center
|Win
|15-0-1
|align=left| Shawn Garnett
| UD || 8 
|2006-06-23 || align=left| Polson Pier, Toronto, Canada
|align=left|
|-align=center
|Win
|14-0-1
|align=left| Maurice Brantley
| TKO || 4 
|2006-05-24 || align=left| Métropolis, Montreal, Canada
|align=left|
|-align=center
|Win
|13-0-1
|align=left| Walter Sergio Gomez
| TKO || 5 
|2006-04-11 || align=left| Fairmont Royal York Hotel, Toronto, Canada
|align=left|
|-align=center
|Win
|12-0-1
|align=left| Darien Ford
| DQ || 6 
|2006-02-25 || align=left| Casino du Lac-Leamy, Hull, Canada
|align=left|
|-align=center
|Win
|11-0-1
|align=left| Claudio Ortiz
| UD || 10 
|2005-12-10 || align=left| Montreal Casino, Montreal, Canada
|align=left|
|-align=center
|Win
|10-0-1
|align=left| Adam Green
| UD || 10 
|2005-11-02 || align=left| Métropolis, Montreal, Canada
|align=left|
|-align=center
|Win
|9-0-1
|align=left| Anthony Ivory
| UD || 6 
|2005-09-10 || align=left| Montreal Casino, Montreal, Canada
|align=left|
|-align=center
|Win
|8-0-1
|align=left| Verdell Smith
| TKO || 6 
|2005-05-28 || align=left| Casino du Lac-Leamy, Hull, Canada
|align=left|
|-align=center
|Win
|7-0-1
|align=left| Denis De Barros
| KO || 1 
|2005-05-14 || align=left| Montreal Casino, Montreal, Canada
|align=left|
|-align=center
|Win
|6-0-1
|align=left| William Woods
| KO || 1 
|2005-04-21 || align=left| Club Soda, Montreal, Canada
|align=left|
|-align=center
|Win
|5-0-1
|align=left| Billy Lyell
| MD || 4 
|2005-04-09 || align=left| Montreal Casino, Montreal, Canada
|align=left|
|-align=center
|Win
|4-0-1
|align=left| Joseph Gomez
| TKO || 4 
|2005-02-26 || align=left| Casino du Lac-Leamy, Hull, Canada
|align=left|
|-align=center
|Win
|3-0-1
|align=left| Darren Kenny
| TKO || 3 
|2005-02-03 || align=left| Club Soda, Montreal, Canada
|align=left|
|-align=center
|Win
|2-0-1
|align=left| Mark Riggs
| SD || 8 
|2004-09-09 || align=left| Fort Garry Place, Winnipeg, Canada
|align=left|
|-align=center
|Win
|1-0-1
|align=left| Tommy Poey
| TKO || 1 
|2004-05-22 || align=left| Cornwall Civic Complex, Cornwall, Canada
|align=left|
|-align=center
|style="background:#abcdef;"|Draw
|0-0-1
|align=left| Greg Bazile
| PTS || 4 
| 2004-04-17 || align=left| Hershey Centre, Mississauga, Canada
|align=left|
|-align=center

References

External links
 

Welterweight boxers
Romanian expatriates in Canada
Living people
1979 births
Romanian male boxers